People's Police Television (Vietnamese: Truyền hình Công an Nhân dân; Abbreviated as ANTV) is a specialized television channel with information about the Vietnam People's Public Security and social order and security situation, directly under the Ministry of Public Security of Vietnam. This channel specializes in producing programs to air on VTV, ANTV, etc.

People's Police Television was broadcast on the Vietnam Television, SCTV, HTVC, THVL, K+, Hanoicab, VTC satellite television, MyTV, and terrestrial digital TV and satellite numbers of AVG. Reporters of the television channel are present at all General Departments, Commanding posts and 63 provincial and city police offices in Vietnam. In addition to the security categories, the People's Police TV channel will also feature movies, music and theatrical categories.

History 
On 3 December 2010, the Prime Minister of Vietnam Nguyễn Tấn Dũng agreed to set up the People's Police Television. This channel was co-produced by the Radio, Television and Film Center of the People's Police with AVG to produce programs. During the press conference announcing the founding of the TV channel on 8 January 2011, Lieutenant General Nguyễn Khánh Toàn, Deputy Minister of Public Security, expected this combination will help the new TV channel to move towards financial autonomy, independent of the state budget. The channel was on a test broadcast from 00:00 on 1 December 2011 and officially broadcast from 20:30 on 11 December 2011.

"Humanities, credibility, timely, attractive" are the four criteria that Lieutenant General, author Hữu Ước, Editor-in-Chief of ANTV after the launch.

On 8 January 2014, ANTV officially launched its official website  after 6 months of testing.

Incident 
On 27 February 2016, a serious error was spotted on the noon weather forecast. Accordingly, in the weather forecast for the coming days in the Southern Vietnam, it forecasted the weather for 30 February (a non-existent day) with the lowest temperature of 21 °C, the highest temperature of 35 °C.

References

Television networks in Vietnam
Vietnamese-language television
Vietnamese-language television networks
2011 establishments in Vietnam